McFarlan is a surname. Notable people with the surname include:

Alex McFarlan (1869–1939), American baseball player
Dan McFarlan (1873–1924), American baseball player
Duncan McFarlan (died 1816), American politician

See also
McFarlan, North Carolina, city in North Carolina, United States
McFarlan Automobile, American automobile
Macfarlan
MacFarlane
McFarlane